WSRK (103.9 FM) is a radio station broadcasting an adult contemporary format, playing music from the 1980s, 1990s, and today. It is licensed to Oneonta, New York, United States, and is owned by Townsquare Media.

References

External links

SRK
Townsquare Media radio stations
Radio stations established in 1970
1970 establishments in New York (state)